The dorsal nasal artery is an artery of the face. It is one of the two terminal branches of the ophthalmic artery. It contributes arterial supply to the lacrimal sac, and outer surface of the nose.

Structure

Origin 
The dorsal nasal artery is one of the two terminal branches of the ophthalmic artery (the other being the supratrochlear artery). It arises in the superomedial orbit.

Course and relations 
It passes anteriorly to exit the orbit between the trochlea (superiorly), the medial palpebral ligament (inferiorly). It gives a branch to the lacrimal sac before bifurcating into two branches: one branch anastomoses with the terminal (angular) part of the facial artery and is important for the blood supply of the face; the other travels along the dorsum of the nose to supply the outer surface of the nose, and forms anastomoses with its contralateral fellow, and with the lateral nasal branch of the facial artery.

Distribution 
The dorsal nasal artery contributes arterial supply to the lacrimal sac, and the outer surface of the nose.

In around 20% of individuals, it also supplies the tip of the nose.

References

Arteries of the head and neck